Örencik ( in 1925) is a neighbourhood in Haliliye District of Şanlıurfa Province, Turkey. As of 2020, the population in the neighbourhood is 1,911.

See Also
 Göbekli Tepe

References

Villages in Şanlıurfa Province